Peter Whittle (27 February 1927 – 10 August 2021) was a mathematician and statistician from New Zealand, working in the fields of stochastic nets, optimal control, time series analysis, stochastic optimisation and stochastic dynamics. From 1967 to 1994, he was the Churchill Professor of Mathematics for Operational Research at the University of Cambridge.

Career

Whittle was born in Wellington. He graduated from the University of New Zealand in 1947 with a BSc in mathematics and physics and in 1948 with an MSc in mathematics. 

He then moved to Uppsala, Sweden in 1950 to study for his PhD with Herman Wold (at Uppsala University). His thesis, Hypothesis Testing in Time Series, generalised Wold's autoregressive representation theorem for univariate stationary processes to multivariate processes. Whittle's thesis was published in 1951. A synopsis of Whittle's thesis also appeared as an appendix to the second edition of Wold's book on time-series analysis. Whittle remained in Uppsala at the Statistics Institute as a docent until 1953, when he returned to New Zealand.

In New Zealand, Whittle worked at the Department of Scientific and Industrial Research (DSIR) in the Applied Mathematics Laboratory (later named the Applied Mathematics Division).

In 1959 Whittle was appointed to a lectureship in Cambridge University. Whittle was appointed Professor of Mathematical statistics at the University of Manchester in 1961. After six years in Manchester, Whittle returned to Cambridge as the Churchill Professor of Mathematics for Operational Research, a post he held until his retirement in 1994. From 1973, he was also Director of the Statistical Laboratory, University of Cambridge.
He was a fellow of Churchill College, Cambridge. He died in Cambridge, England.

Recognition
Whittle was elected a Fellow of the Royal Society in 1978, and an Honorary Fellow of the Royal Society of New Zealand in 1981. The Royal Society awarded him their Sylvester Medal in 1994 in recognition of his "major distinctive contributions to time series analysis, to optimisation theory, and to a wide range of topics in applied probability theory and the mathematics of operational research". In 1986, the Institute for Operations Research and the Management Sciences awarded Whittle the Lanchester Prize for his book Systems in Stochastic Equilibrium and the John von Neumann Theory Prize in 1997 for his "outstanding contributions to the theory of operations research and management science".
He was elected to the 2002 class of Fellows of the Institute for Operations Research and the Management Sciences.

Personal life

In 1951, Whittle married a Finnish woman, Käthe Blomquist, whom he had met in Sweden. The Whittle family has six children.

Bibliography

Books

Republished as: 

Republished as: 

Republished as:

Selected articles

 Reprinted with an introduction by Matthew Calder and Richard A. Davis as 

 Reprinted as 

 

 

 
  (Available online)

Biographical works

 
 Peter Whittle. 1994. "Almost Home". pages 1–28.
 Anonymous. "Publications of Peter Whittle". pages xxi–xxvi. (A list of 129 publications.)
 Anonymous. Biographical sketch (untitled). page xxvii.

Notes

References

External links
Webpage of the Cambridge Statistical Laboratory
 
 
 INFORMS: Biography of Peter Whittle from the Institute for Operations Research and the Managerial Sciences

1927 births
2021 deaths
New Zealand Fellows of the Royal Society
Fellows of the Royal Society of New Zealand
John von Neumann Theory Prize winners
Time series econometricians
Probability theorists
Control theorists
Systems scientists
British operations researchers
British statisticians
New Zealand statisticians
New Zealand mathematicians
Cambridge mathematicians
Fellows of Churchill College, Cambridge
Academics of the University of Manchester
Uppsala University alumni

Scientists from Wellington City
Professors of the University of Cambridge
University of New Zealand alumni
Fellows of the Institute for Operations Research and the Management Sciences
Mathematical statisticians